Deng Kai (born December 1959) is a Chinese politician currently serving as the deputy party secretary of the All-China Federation of Trade Unions. He was previously deputy Party Secretary of Henan province. He worked for most of his career in Jilin province.

Biography

Deng Kai was born in Gai County, Liaoning in 1959. He attended Jilin University and obtained a degree in Chinese literature; he also has a master's degree in economics. He joined the workforce in July 1984. He joined the Communist Party of China in 1986. For much of his earlier career he worked for the provincial Communist Youth League organization. He served there until 1997 when he was transferred to work for the provincial party's Organization Department, handling administrative affairs. He was named a deputy head of the department in 1998.

In 2002 Deng became a member of the provincial Party Standing Committee and the head of the provincial propaganda department. In 2004 he was named party chief of the Yanbian Korean Autonomous Prefecture. In April 2011 he was transferred to Henan to serve as the chief of the organization department in that province; in October he was elevated to deputy party chief. In August 2012 he was named the head of the provincial Party School, and the head of the provincial College of Administrative Affairs. Deng was transferred to the All-China Federation of Trade Unions in February 2017 to take on a leading post there.

Deng is an alternate member of the 18th Central Committee of the Communist Party of China. He was also a delegate to the 12th National People's Congress.

References

1959 births
Living people
Alternate members of the 18th Central Committee of the Chinese Communist Party
Chinese Communist Party politicians from Liaoning
Jilin University alumni
Members of the Standing Committee of the 13th National People's Congress
People's Republic of China politicians from Liaoning
Politicians from Yingkou